Clearfield Alliance Christian School is a private Christian school located near the borough of Clearfield, Pennsylvania, in Clearfield County, Pennsylvania.  The school has been serving students since it was established in 1982.

Sports
Boys Basketball
Girls Basketbal

References

Christian schools in Pennsylvania
Private schools in Pennsylvania
Schools in Clearfield County, Pennsylvania